Johan Sepp (also Juhan Sepp; 5 June 1884 (Saarde Parish, Kreis Pernau – 18 August 1953 New York) was an Estonian politician.
In 1926 he was Minister of Justice.

References

1884 births
1953 deaths
people from Saarde Parish
People from Kreis Pernau
Landlords' Party politicians
Justice ministers of Estonia
Members of the Riigikogu, 1923–1926
Members of the Riigikogu, 1926–1929
Members of the Estonian National Assembly
University of Tartu alumni
Estonian World War II refugees
Estonian emigrants to the United States